Milagros is a 1997 Philippine drama film directed by Marilou Diaz-Abaya. The film stars Sharmaine Arnaiz as the title role. The film won 10 out of 15 awards in the 21st Gawad Urian Awards, including Best Film. It was selected as the Philippine entry for the Best Foreign Language Film at the 70th Academy Awards, but was not accepted as a nominee.

Cast
Sharmaine Arnaiz as Lagring
Dante Rivero as Nano
Joel Torre as Junie
Raymond Bagatsing as Benneth
Nonie Buencamino as Ramonito
Elizabeth Oropesa as Miding
Mia Gutierrez as Arlene
Rolando Tinio as Fr. Fermin
Joe Jardi as Bebot
Tanya Gomez as Chayong
Jim Pebanco as Pilo
Ramon Reyes as Cirilo

References

External links

1997 films
1997 drama films
Philippine drama films
1990s Tagalog-language films
Films directed by Marilou Diaz-Abaya
Merdeka Film Productions films